Hiellen 2, properly known as Hiellen Indian Reserve No. 2, is an Indian reserve on the north coast of Graham Island in the Queen Charlotte Islands, British Columbia, Canada.  It is located at the mouth of the Hiellen River and is the site of the former Haida village of Hiellen, once one of the largest and most important.  The reserve is under the administration of the Old Massett Village Council and is 27.4 ha in size.

References

Reserves/Settlements/Villages Detail, Indian and Northern Affairs Canada

Indian reserves in Haida Gwaii
Haida
Graham Island